Recessional agriculture is a form of agricultural cultivation that takes place on a floodplain.  Farmers practice recessional agriculture by successively planting in the flooded areas after the waters recede. Thus recessional agriculture serves as a rudimentary form of irrigation. Soil type is an important consideration in recessional agriculture. One type of crop grown by this method is sorghum. Clay soils are especially suitable for recessional agriculture.

References

Agriculture